First Love is the debut studio album by South Korean singer Lee Hi. Before its release, her agency, YG Entertainment, stated that Lee Hi would take on genres like jazz and rhythm and blues that are rarely heard in the K-pop industry.

Background and release 
Lee Hi's first teaser picture was released on February 25, 2013. It depicted Lee Hi with three questions floating around her, "March 1st?", "March 7th?", and "March 21st?" Given that her comeback had been delayed multiple times before this picture led fans to believe it had been delayed once again. The second teaser was released on February 26, 2013, and created similar confusion, depicting Lee Hi posing with the questions "Mini?", "Single?" and "Album?" floating above her head.

On March 1, 2013, Lee Hi's official YouTube channel pre-released "Turn It Up", the intro to her upcoming full-length album. This revealed the "March 1st?" question on her second teaser. It was announced that March 7 would see the digital release of a preview mini-album featuring the first five songs off of First Love. From this release she promoted "It's Over" as a title track, winning her first Inkigayo mutizen on March 24 with the song. The full album was originally scheduled for release on March 21 but was later delayed to March 28. "Rose" served as the title track of the album's physical release, reaching the summit of Gaon's national singles chart.

Track listing 
The track listing and credits were revealed by YG Entertainment.

Chart performance

It's Over

Rose

Other charted songs

Release history

References

2013 debut albums
YG Entertainment albums
KMP Holdings albums
Lee Hi albums